A list of films produced by the Marathi language film industry based in Maharashtra in the year 1953.

1953 Releases
A list of Marathi films released in 1953.

References

Lists of 1953 films by country or language
 Marathi
1953